Christ's Church, Jinyuan is a Protestant church located in Jinyuan District, Taiyuan, Shanxi, China.

History 
The church was originally built in 1914 by American minister Nie Erde. It was added to Taiyuan's list of Historical Cultural Heritage in 2009. A new building was added to the church in 2010.

References

Further reading 
 

Churches in Shanxi
Tourist attractions in Taiyuan
1914 establishments in China
Protestant churches in China
Churches completed in 1914